Torso Murders can refer to the following murders, and Torso Killer or Torso Murderer can refer to their perpetrators:

 Cleveland Torso Murders, in the 1930s in Cleveland, Ohio, United States
 Thames Torso Murders, in the 1880s on the River Thames in London, England, United Kingdom
 Richard Cottingham, convicted New Jersey serial killer known as the "Torso Killer" believed to be responsible for multiple murders from 1967–1980